Cody Walker (born 7 November 1997 in Australia) is an Australian rugby union player who played for the New South Wales Waratahs in Super Rugby. His playing position is prop. He was signed for the Waratahs squad in 2019. Walker also represented  in the National Rugby Championship in 2018 and 2019, having come through the Waratahs youth systems. In 2017, he represented Australia U20.

Reference list

External links
Rugby.com.au profile
itsrugby.co.uk profile

1997 births
Australian rugby union players
Living people
Rugby union props
New South Wales Waratahs players
New South Wales Country Eagles players